Utada the Best is Japanese pop/R&B singer-songwriter Hikaru Utada's first English language compilation album, released on November 24, 2010, the same day as Utada Hikaru Single Collection Vol. 2. The album is a "best of" album featuring her more prominent and popular songs from her English career as Utada.

Background
The album was announced via her Japanese Utada site (www.Utada.jp), without much in way of promoting or officially announcing it. It has also been included in various other sources. The album is available for sale in Japan only.
Utada the Best features both songs from her 2004 album Exodus, and her 2009 album This Is the One, as well as previously-released maxi-CD remixes by various artists. The album features both singles and non-singles from both albums.

The cover of Utada the Best is the same picture for that of her "Exodus '04" single cover.

Utada herself stated that the release of the compilation album is "entirely against [her] will". She also said "I understand that if it doesn't sell I'm the one who will take the hit, but to be honest, I don't want my fans putting down money for something that my heart isn't in." She posted on her official Twitter account: "The release of "Utada the best" is entirely against my will. I wish that my fans won't have to buy it. There's no new material in it."

Commercial performance
The album sold a total of 20,278 copies, peaking at No. 12 on Oricon charts. This is Utada's overall lowest selling album released in Japan, and is her only album (other than Precious) that did not reach No. 1 on any chart in Japan.

Track listing

Release history

References

2010 compilation albums
Hikaru Utada compilation albums